Sascha Subarsky (born 28 February 1996) is an Austrian swimmer. He competed in the men's 100 metre butterfly event at the 2018 FINA World Swimming Championships (25 m), in Hangzhou, China.

References

External links
 

1996 births
Living people
Austrian male butterfly swimmers
Place of birth missing (living people)